The 1974 World Field Archery Championships were held in Zagreb, Yugoslavia.

Medal summary (Men's individual)

Medal summary (Women's individual)

Medal summary (team events)
No team event held at this championships.

References

E
Sports competitions in Zagreb
1974 in Yugoslav sport
International sports competitions hosted by Austria 
Archery competitions in Yugoslavia
World Field Archery Championships
August 1974 sports events in Europe
1970s in Zagreb